
Gmina Mełgiew is a rural gmina (administrative district) in Świdnik County, Lublin Voivodeship, in eastern Poland.

Villages
Gmina Mełgiew contains the villages and settlements of Dominów, Franciszków, Jacków, Janówek, Janowice, Józefów, Krępiec, Krzesimów, Lubieniec, Mełgiew, Minkowice, Minkowice-Kolonia, Nowy Krępiec, Piotrówek Pierwszy, Podzamcze, Trzeciaków, Trzeszkowice and Żurawniki.

Neighbouring gminas
Gmina Mełgiew is bordered by the town of Świdnik and by the gminas of Głusk, Łęczna, Milejów, Piaski and Wólka.

References

Polish official population figures 2006

Melgiew
Świdnik County